Persian medicine may refer to:

 Iranian traditional medicine (traditional Persian medicine)
 Ancient Iranian medicine: premodern history of medicine in Persia
 Healthcare in Iran: medical care in modern Iran